João Moreira (born September 26, 1983, in Curitiba- Paraná , Brazil), is a jockey currently based in Hong Kong after successful seasons in Brazil, Hong Kong, Japan and Singapore.

He is believed to have a set a World record of riding eight winners from eight rides on the nine event card on Friday September 6, 2013 at Kranji race course in Singapore.

His career started as an apprentice in 2005/06 season in his native home country of Brazil.

Major wins
 United Arab Emirates
 Dubai Golden Shaheen - (1) - Sterling City (2014)
 Al Quoz Sprint - (1) - Amber Sky (2014)
 Dubai Turf - (1) - Vivlos (2017)

 Australia
 Coolmore Classic - (1) - Brazen Beau (2014)
 Newmarket Handicap - (1) - Brazen Beau (2015)
 Oakleigh Plate - (1) - Sheidel (2017)

 Hong Kong
 Hong Kong Mile - (1) - Able Friend (2014)
 Hong Kong Cup - (1) - Designs on Rome (2014)
 Hong Kong Sprint - (2) - Peniaphobia (2015), Beat The Clock (2019)
 Hong Kong Vase - (3) - Satono Crown (2016), Glory Vase (2019, 2021)
 Champions Mile - (2) - Able Friend (2015), Maurice (2016)
 Hong Kong Derby - (2) - Rapper Dragon (2017), Sky Darci (2021)
 Hong Kong Stewards' Cup - (2) - Able Friend (2015), Waikuku (2020)
 Hong Kong Gold Cup - (3) - Military Attack (2014), Designs on Rome (2015),  Time Warp (2020)
 Hong Kong Classic Mile - (2) - Able Friend (2014), Rapper Dragon (2017)
 Hong Kong Classic Cup - (1) - Rapper Dragon (2017)
 Centenary Sprint Cup - (4) - Amber Sky (2014), Beat The Clock (2019, 2020), Hot King Prawn (2021)
 Chairman's Sprint Prize - (1) - Beat The Clock (2019)
 Queen Elizabeth II Cup - (1) - Neorealism (2017)
 Queen's Silver Jubilee Cup - (2) - Able Friend (2015), Waikuku (2021)

 Japan
 Queen Elizabeth II Commemorative Cup - (1) - Lys Gracieux (2018)

Performance at the Hong Kong Jockey Club

References

 The Magic of Moreira     (English Language)
 Joao Moreira sold on Sydney racing scene   (English Language)

Hong Kong jockeys
1984 births
Living people
Brazilian jockeys
Sportspeople from Curitiba
Hong Kong people of Brazilian descent